The Serbian Basketball Player of the Year award is established in 2015 to recognize the best basketball player of the year from Serbia. The winners are men's and women's basketball players who have Serbian citizenship, and whose performances with its basketball club and/or national team throughout the year has reached the highest level of excellence. All players with Serbian citizenship, regardless of where they play in the world, qualify for the award. The winners are selected by the Basketball Federation of Serbia.

All-time award winners

Multiple winners

Special award winners 
 3×3 Player of the Year: Dušan Domović Bulut (2019)
 2021 Greatest Achievements: Men's national 3x3 team and Women's national team

See also 
 Serbian Footballer of the Year
 Serbian Sportspersonality of the Year
 Awards of Olympic Committee of Serbia
 Slobodan Piva Ivković Award for Lifetime Achievement

Notes

References

External links
Basketball Federation of Serbia Official Website

Annual events in Serbia
Awards established in 2015
Basketball awards in Serbia
European basketball awards
Serbian sports trophies and awards
2015 establishments in Serbia